Bomu may refer to:
 Bomu language, a language of West Africa
Distinct from the standard variety of the Dogon language of West Africa, known Toro so and as Bomu Tegu or just Bomu in the plains languages; see Escarpment Dogon
 The Mbomou River, also called the Bomu river, a river forming part of the Central African Republic—Democratic Republic of the Congo border
 Domaine Chasse Bomu, a nature reserve in the Democratic Republic of the Congo whose name translates as Bomu Strict Nature Reserve
 Bomu or baimu refers to the wood of several species of Cupressaceae used in China for furniture
 Botswana Music Union, the Recording Industry of Botswana's music industry awards

See also 
 Mwachirunge Bomu, a settlement in Kenya's Coastal Province